On Byung-Hoon (Hangul: 온병훈; born 7 August 1985) is a South Korean football player who plays for Gimhae City as a midfielder.

Club career
A draftee from Soongsil University, On Byung-Hoon saw little game time with the Pohang Steelers from 2006 to 2007. On transferred to Jeonbuk Hyundai Motors for 2008, but still struggled to establish himself as a regular first team starter.  After a total of 6 K-League games, and a single goal, in a two-year spell with Jeonbuk, On made a further move to Daegu FC for the 2010 season.

International career
On was a member of the U-20 National side in 2005, and played 7 games.

Club career statistics

External links 
 

1985 births
Living people
Association football forwards
South Korean footballers
Pohang Steelers players
Jeonbuk Hyundai Motors players
Daegu FC players
K League 1 players
Korea National League players
Footballers from Seoul